Hot Pantz are a UK female vocal duo, formed by Kelly Robinson and Shelley Mintrim. They released the single, "Give U One 4 Christmas" in 2004, which despite radio airplay failed to reach the Top 40 in the UK Singles Chart, peaking at #64.

References

English pop girl groups
English pop music duos
English vocal groups